Coghlan's is a major Canadian producer of camping goods and accessories. Their products can be found in major outdoor retail outlets such as REI and Cabela's in the United States and Mountain Equipment Co-op in Canada.

History 
Coghlan's was founded in Winnipeg, Manitoba, in 1959 as Coghlan's Gas Appliances. The firm's first product was the Camp Stove Toaster.

Once, Norm Coghlan (1927-2013) also sold camping equipment in his store on the side.  When campers began bringing their camp stoves and lanterns seeking parts and repairs, he gradually expanded his product line.  Operations expanded to include distribution when Coghlan's began selling camp stove toasters. Since then, it has grown to over 450 products and is the largest producer of camping accessories in Canada and the United States.  It is still a family-owned company.

See also
 Coleman Company

References

External links
Coghlan's

Manufacturing companies of Canada
1959 establishments in Manitoba
Camping equipment manufacturers
Manufacturing companies established in 1959
Canadian companies established in 1959
Canadian brands